The Jordan Formation (also classified as the Jordan Sandstone or the Jordan Member of the Trempealeau Formation) is a siliciclastic sedimentary rock unit identified in Illinois, Michigan, Wisconsin, Minnesota, and Iowa. Named for distinctive outcrops in the Minnesota River Valley near the town of Jordan, it extends throughout the Iowa Shelf and eastward over the Wisconsin Arch and Lincoln anticline into the Michigan Basin.

Stratigraphically, the Jordan Formation is the uppermost unit of the type St. Croixan Series (historically, the uppermost subdivision of the Cambrian in North America). It is predominantly composed of mature, poorly cemented quartz sandstone, though several distinct facies have been identified on the basis of grain size, feldspathic content, and sedimentary structures.

The Jordan is an important source of silica. Historically, the unit has been mined extensively for glass manufacturing, though recently it has been utilized as a source of frac sand. This porous, poorly cemented stratum is also an important aquifer and a major source of drinking water for people throughout the upper Midwest.

Definition and history 
The earliest references to strata now referred to as Jordan were made by many of the pioneering geologists of the upper Midwest. In an 1852 report on the geology of Wisconsin, Iowa, and Minnesota, D. D. Owen assigned it to the uppermost part of his “Lower Sandstone” (the “Upper Sandstone” referring to what is now called the St. Peter). The term Jordan Sandstone was first applied in 1874 by N. H. Winchell, who based his description on exposures in a quarry near Jordan, Minnesota.

Extent 
The Jordan Formation is represented extensively by outcrops and exposures throughout Wisconsin, Minnesota, and Iowa  Geologic Map of Wisconsin; Geologic Map of Minnesota). It is particularly well represented in outcrops along the Mississippi River and its tributaries. It is also present in the subsurface in many parts of these states, and it has been identified in cores and drill cuttings in Illinois, Missouri, and Michigan as well (though here, it is not found at the surface).

Beyond this region, rocks of similar age are present, though they are referred to other lithostratigraphic units. Presumed lateral equivalents of the Jordan Formation include the Eminence Dolostone of the Illinois Basin, the Au Train Formation of the northern Michigan Basin, and some horizon of the Knox Supergroup in the east-central United States.

Sedimentology 
The Jordan Formation is composed primarily of very mature, well-sorted sandstones of uncertain provenance. Although it is composed primarily of quartz grains, feldspathic and lithic fragments are present in significant quantities, as are a variety of bioclasts derived from marine invertebrates.

At least three distinct facies types have been identified and distinguished on the basis of sedimentary structures and grain size: a hummocky cross stratified facies, a trough-cross stratified facies, and a large scale-cross stratified facies. Overall, the Jordan Formation displays a coarsening upward sequence.

Stratigraphy 
Generally, the Jordan Sandstone is assigned formational rank and considered the uppermost subdivision of the Trempealeau Group (though it is sometimes ranked as the uppermost Member of the Trempealeau Formation). Although the original type section is no longer exposed, a new reference section is defined at an exposure near Homer, Minnesota in Winona County, where several distinct tongues of the formation are seen intertonguing. The Jordan Sandstone ranges from 15 to 115 meters (50 to 377 feet).

Underlying 
The lower Jordan contains relatively high proportions of feldspathic material and its lower contact is fairly gradational. Throughout much of the upper Midwest, it overlies the St. Lawrence Formation, which consists of a dolomitic facies (the Black Earth Member) and a silty facies (the Lodi Member). Earlier studies often combined the Jordan and the St. Lawrence, though they may be distinguished on the basis of lithology. The contact between these units is generally set at the top of the uppermost siltstone bed of the Lodi, where it is overlain by a continuous layer of sandstone.

Overlying 

The Jordan is overlain by the Oneota Formation, a dolomitic carbonate unit of early Ordovician Age. The massive, well-cemented microbial carbonates of the Oneota Formation generally overlie several meters of sandy shale with calcareous interbeds referred to as Coon Valley or Stockton Hill Member. Although these beds have traditionally been allied with the Jordan Formation based on lithostratigraphic properties, but more recent sequence and biostratigraphic studies suggest it is more closely allied with the Oneota. The upper contact of the Jordan is interpreted to be a topographically complex, unconformable surface.

Subunits 
The Jordan has at least four named subdivisions distinguished on the basis of sedimentary structures, grain size, and stratigraphic position. The basal Norwalk Member is composed of fine grained hummocky-stratified sandstone containing a relatively high proportion of feldspar. This subunit is heavily bioturbated, and contains occasional fossils of marine organisms.

The Norwalk is generally overlain by the Van Oser Member, a medium-grained trough-cross stratified quartz sandstone facies. At least two tongues of this facies are present in the Jordan Formation, generally separated by either a fine-grained hummocky stratified sandstone called the Waukon Member, or a bioturbated, laminated feldspathic quartz sandstone with dolomitic cement, which is called the Sunset Point Member.

Depositional history

Deposition 
Owing to the presence of rare fossils and bioturbated sediments, the Jordan Formation is interpreted as a product of marine depositional environments. The bioturbated, fine-grained facies are interpreted as lower shoreface deposits influenced by tidal fluctuations and storms. The coarser, cross-bedded deposits, such as the Van Oser, may be deposits of large, submarine dunes.

The Jordan is one of many “sheet sandstones” which covered a large swath of the continent during the late Cambrian. At this time, most of North America was covered by shallow sea, blanketed by laterally continuous sheets of sandstone and carbonate covering tens of thousands of square kilometers (the Paleozoic orthoquartzite-carbonate suite).

Age 
The Jordan Formation has long been regarded as Upper Cambrian, more specifically, it encompasses part of the Saukia trilobite biozone, as determined by the presence of trilobites such as Tellerina strigosa. Conodonts from the Norwalk Member suggest assignment to the Eoconodontus zone, which corroborates the ages provided by trilobites.

The overlying Oneota Formation is early Ordovician in age, as indicated by conodonts and trilobites. This suggests that the Cambrian-Ordovician boundary should reside either in the upper Jordan, or at the contact with the overlying Oneota. But this is still an area of active study.

Economic impact

Frac sand 
The well-sorted, well-rounded sediments of the Jordan Formation are mined extensively as a proppant for hydraulic fracturing. The sand is commonly added to fracking fluids for the purpose of keeping induced hydraulic fractures open. The thickness of the unit, its relatively poor cementation, and its close proximity to major waterways and roadways has made it a lucrative target for mining companies.

Groundwater 
The coarse grained Jordan Formation is poorly cemented, and it has a low clay content, meaning the unit is highly permeable. These properties make it an excellent aquifer, which extends throughout the north-central United States.

See also 

 Baraboo Quartzite
 Cambrian
 Driftless Area
 Nonesuch Shale
 Potsdam Sandstone
 St. Peter Sandstone

References

External links 
 GEOLEX: Information on the history, age, and extent of the Jordan Formation
 Generalized geologic column of bedrock units in Wisconsin, showing the stratigraphic context of the Jordan Formation
 The website for the Wisconsin Geological and Natural History Survey. A resource for those interested in more information about the geology of Wisconsin.

Geologic formations of the United States
Sandstone formations of the United States
Fossiliferous stratigraphic units of the United States
Cambrian United States
Geology of Illinois
Geology of Iowa
Geology of Michigan
Geology of Minnesota
Geology of Missouri
Geology of Wisconsin